Richard Chancellor (died 10 November 1556) was an English explorer and navigator; the first to penetrate to the White Sea and establish relations with the Tsardom of Russia.

Life

Chancellor, a native of Bristol, was brought up in the household of Sir Henry Sidney, an influential English gentleman. In 1550 Chancellor sailed as an apprentice pilot to the eastern Mediterranean in the bark Aucher commanded by Roger Bodenham.  He acquired additional geographical and maritime proficiency from the explorer Sebastian Cabot and the geographer John Dee. Cabot had always been interested in making a voyage to Asia through the Arctic, and for this purpose an association of London merchants chartered the Company of Merchant Adventurers in 1552–1553, with the Duke of Northumberland as principal patron. They hoped not only to discover a north-east passage but also to find a market for English woolen cloth.

 
Sir Hugh Willoughby was given three ships for the search, and Chancellor went as chief navigator and second-in-command. Their orders from Cabot included behaving peaceably towards any people they met and keeping a regular journal.  According to David Howarth contrary winds delayed the expedition seriously but they eventually arrived off the North Cape as autumn set in, and were separated by a violent storm; Willoughby, with two ships, sailed east and discovered Novaya Zemlya but died during the winter with all his men on the Kola Peninsula some distance east of Murmansk. The bodies and journals were discovered by Russian fisherman in the spring. Meanwhile, Chancellor noted and named the North Cape and with his ship Edward Bonaventure called at the Norwegian port of Vardø, the last town in Scandinavia before the inhospitable arctic coast of Russia; here they met Scottish fishermen who warned them of the dangers ahead.  However continuing eastwards they found the entrance to the White Sea and after obtaining directions from local people dropped anchor at the mouth of the Dvina River, where the port of Archangel now stands.

When Tsar Ivan the Terrible heard of Chancellor's arrival, he immediately invited the exotic guest to visit Moscow for an audience at the royal court. Chancellor made the journey of over 600 miles (over 1000 kilometres) to Moscow by horse-drawn sleigh through snow and ice-covered country. He found Moscow large (much larger than London) and primitively built, most houses being constructed of wood. However, the palace of the tsar was very luxurious, as were the dinners he offered Chancellor.  
The tsar was pleased to open the sea trading routes with England and other countries, as Muscovy did not yet have a connection with the Baltic Sea at the time and the entire area was contested by the neighbouring powers of the Polish–Lithuanian Commonwealth and the Swedish Empire. In addition, the Hanseatic League had a monopoly on the trade between Muscovy and Central and Western Europe. Chancellor was no less optimistic, finding a good market for his English wool, and receiving furs and other Muscovian goods in return. The Tsar gave him letters for England inviting English traders and promising trade privileges.
 

When Chancellor returned to England in the summer of 1554, King Edward was dead, and his successor, Mary, had executed Northumberland for attempting to place Lady Jane Grey on the throne. No stigma attached to Chancellor, and the Muscovy Company, as the association was now called, sent him again to the White Sea in 1555. On this voyage he learned what had happened to Willoughby, recovered his papers, and found out about the discovery of Novaya Zemlya. Chancellor spent the summer of 1555 dealing with the tsar, organising trade, and trying to learn how China might be reached by the northern route.

In July 1556 Chancellor departed for home, taking with him the first Russian ambassador to England, Osip Nepeya. The fleet consisted of four ships, the Philip and Mary, the Edward Bonadventure and Willoughby's relaunched ships, the Bona Confidentia and the Bona Esperanza.  Along the coast of Norway the weather turned bad and the fleet sought shelter in Trondheim. The Bona Esperanza sank and the Bona Confidentia appeared to enter the fjord but was never heard of again. Only the Philip and Mary successfully wintered in Trondheim and arrived in London in April 1557. The Edward Bonadventure did not attempt to enter the fjord, instead they reached the Scottish coast and were driven ashore by a storm at Pitsligo near Aberdeen on 10 November 1556. Most of the crew, including Chancellor, lost their lives. Only the Russian envoy and a few others survived and reached London the following year.

In fiction

Chancellor appears as a major character in the novel The Ringed Castle (1971), fifth of the six novels in  Dorothy Dunnett's historical fiction series, The Lymond Chronicles.

See also
 Company of Merchant Adventurers
 Society of Merchant Venturers
 Muscovy Company

Notes

References 
 "Richard Chancellor", 1997, in Encyclopedia of World Biography, Detroit, Gale
 Dulles, Foster Rhea. Eastward Ho! The First English Adventurers to the Orient: Richard Chancellor, Anthony Jenkinson, James Lancaster, William Adams, Sir Thomas Roe, 1931, London, John Lane.
 Dunnett, Dorothy. "The Ringed Castle," 1971, New York, Vintage Books.
 
Hakluyt, R. "Voyages" "The Voyage of the Bark Aucher to Chios and Candia" 
Howarth, David, 2003, "British Seapower", Robinson, London.
 
 
  Loades, David, ed. Reader's Guide to British History (2003) 1: 245–46, historiography
 
 

1556 deaths
Explorers from Bristol
People of the Grand Duchy of Moscow
White Sea
Explorers of the Arctic
Novaya Zemlya
1521 births
16th-century English people
16th-century explorers
People of the Muscovy Company
Foreign relations of Russia
English sailors